Abdul Rashid Mir (born August 1940) is a Kashmiri businessman, founder & CEO of Cottage Industries Exposition Limited (CIE).

Mir has been named in connection with the Panama Papers.

References

1940 births
Living people
People named in the Panama Papers